Hippotion roseipennis is a moth of the family Sphingidae. It is known from dry areas from KwaZulu-Natal and Mozambique to Zimbabwe, Zambia, Malawi, Tanzania, Kenya, Uganda and south-western Ethiopia.

The larvae feed on the leaves of Rhoicissus tridentata.

References

 Pinhey, E. (1962): Hawk Moths of Central and Southern Africa. Longmans Southern Africa, Cape Town.

Hippotion
Moths described in 1882
Moths of Africa